Turkmenistan participated in the 2014 Asian Games held in Incheon, South Korea from 19 September to 4 October 2014.

80 Turkmen athletes were competing in 12 disciplines: athletics, boxing, cycling road, judo, karate, swimming, taekwondo, tennis, volleyball, weightlifting, wrestling, and wushu.

Turkmen sportsmen won 6 medals (1 silver and 5 bronze) and end up 32 out of 37 countries that took part in the Games.

Medal table

Medalists

Athletics

Men's

Women

Boxing

Men

Cycling

Road
Men

Judo

Men

Women

Karate

Men's kumite

Swimming

Men

Women

Taekwondo

Men

Women

Tennis

Men

Women

Mixed Doubles

Volleyball

Men

Weightlifting

Wrestling

Men's freestyle

Men's Greco-Roman

Women's freestyle

Wushu

Men's sanda

Women's sanda

References

http://www.incheon2014.kr/Sports/Medals/MenuMedallists/?discipline=ALL&Date=ALL&NOC=TKM&lang=en

Nations at the 2014 Asian Games
2014
Asian Games